is a Japanese actress and model. She starred in the horror film Ring, and was also the female lead character in the drama A Story of Love, along with Ring co-star Hiroyuki Sanada. In 2011, her drama Kaseifu no Mita reached a viewer rating of 40%, making it one of the highest rated Japanese dramas of all time.

Biography

Personal life
Matsushima was born in Yokohama, Kanagawa Prefecture. On February 21, 2001, she married Japanese actor Takashi Sorimachi, her co-star in the hit drama GTO (Great Teacher Onizuka). They have two daughters together, born on May 31, 2004, and November 30, 2007. She has been called one of Japan's most beautiful women.

Career

Matsushima has appeared in a number of popular or critically acclaimed dramas, and she has won the Best Actress Award at the Japan Television Drama Academy Awards six times.

In 1997, Matsushima was selected to play the female lead, a poor but happy designer who happens to run a shop in a building owned by a wealthy, arrogant but dying rich man played by Hiroyuki Sanada in the drama A Story of Love. The drama chronicles the trial and tribulations that the leads undergo as their feelings developed into something more than mere friendship.

In 1998, Matsushima starred together with her now husband, Takashi Sorimachi in the drama Great Teacher Onizuka, about a former delinquent turned teacher. The drama which was based on a popular manga, received a 35.7 rating for its final episode, making it one of the highest rated Japanese dramas ever. Matsushima was also selected to play Tsubaki Domyouji, the sister of the main male lead Domyouji Tsukasa in the popular drama Hana Yori Dango (TV series) and Hana Yori Dango Returns. Both dramas were a rating success with the final episode of Hana Yori Dango Returns peaking at 27.6.

Matsushima subsequently appeared as the female lead in the controversial drama Majo no Jōken which centres on the romance between a teacher and her student. Despite its controversial nature, the drama was awarded the best drama at the 21st Japan Television Drama Academy Awards.

In 2011, Matsushima starred in the hit I am Mita, Your Housekeeper, the final episode which garnered the rating of 40%, making it one of the highest rated Japanese dramas of all-time.I am Mita, Your Housekeeper won several awards, including the Best Drama and Best Female Actress awards, at the 71st Television Drama Academy Awards.

Matsushima was also cast as the main lead in the cult classic horror film Ring, often cited as one of the best horror films of all-time. This film brought Matsushima worldwide recognition and it has since been remade into an American film.

Matsushima has also appeared in several other popular films, amongst them the 2000 film Whiteout, which grossed over 4.2 billion yen in Japan. For her role in the film, Matsushima was nominated for the Outstanding Performance by an Actress in a Leading Role award at the 24th Japan Academy Film Prize.

In September 2021, she co-starred in a commercial for Uber Eats alongside Matt Kuwata.

Filmography

TV dramas

Film

Awards

References

External links

 
.
Nanako Matsushima from Sumitomo Life Insurance.
Nanako Matsushima English info
Nanako Matsushima J-Dorama

1973 births
Living people
Actresses from Yokohama
Japanese film actresses
Japanese female models
Asadora lead actors
Taiga drama lead actors
Japanese television actresses
20th-century Japanese actresses
21st-century Japanese actresses